McRee is a surname. Notable people with the surname include:

Lisa McRee (born 1961), American journalist and news anchor
William McRee (1788–1833), United States Army officer

See also
Fort McRee, American Civil War fort in Florida